Platinum Pyramids is the eighth album by rapper/DJ, Egyptian Lover.  The album was released on December 27, 2005 for Egyptian Empire Records and was produced by Egyptian Lover.  The album was his first since 1998's Get Into It; however, it was a commercial failure and did not make it on any album charts. Platinum Pyramids was mixed by John C. Adams.

Track listing
"Party" – 6:09
"Dance Floor" – 5:47
"Keep It Hot" – 5:34
"Soiree at the Shindig" – 4:48
"Sintropolis  Egyptian Lover  5:48
"Dance Erotic" – 4:52
"Throw It Back" – 4:53
"Picturesque" – 4:04
"Move Your Body" – 5:45
"The 808" – 3:09
"Do Your Thang" – 5:08
"Ooo Baby Dance" – 3:56

Egyptian Lover albums
2005 albums
Albums produced by Egyptian Lover